Ancylobacter oerskovii is a Gram-negative, pleomorphic, rod-shaped, non-spore-forming bacteria from the family of Xanthobacteraceae which has been isolated from soil from Muğla in Turkey. Ancylobacter oerskovii has the ability to utilize oxalic acid.

References

Further reading

External links
Type strain of Ancylobacter oerskovii at BacDive -  the Bacterial Diversity Metadatabase

Hyphomicrobiales
Bacteria described in 2008